Wilson syndrome may refer to:
 Wilson's temperature syndrome
 Mowat–Wilson syndrome
 Wilson–Mikity syndrome
 Wilson–Turner syndrome